South Dakota Highway 75 (SD 75) is a state route located in northwest South Dakota.  The southern terminus is at South Dakota Highway 20 west of Bison, and the route runs northerly to the North Dakota border, becoming North Dakota Highway 8.  It is 28 miles (45 kilometers) in length.

History
This is the third use of the South Dakota 75 designation.

The first South Dakota 75 was designated around 1934, in southeast Shannon County. This configuration remained in place until 1976, when it was redesignated as South Dakota Highway 391.

The second use of SD 75 was implemented around 1949, in northwest South Dakota. It was located in northeast Harding County, beginning at South Dakota Highway 8 (current SD 20) and extending northward to the North Dakota border.

Major intersections

References

External links

South Dakota Highways Page: Highways 61-100

075
Transportation in Perkins County, South Dakota